Fever Pitch is a 1997 film starring Colin Firth and Ruth Gemmell, based loosely on Nick Hornby's best-selling memoir, Fever Pitch: A Fan's Life (1992).

Plot
Hornby adapted the book for the screen and fictionalised the story, concentrating on Arsenal's First Division championship-winning season in 1988–89 and its effect on the protagonist's romantic relationship. Firth plays Paul Ashworth, the character based on Hornby, a teacher at a school in south Hertfordshire and his romance with Sarah Hughes (Ruth Gemmell), a new teacher who joins Ashworth's school. The film culminates with the real life events of Arsenal's match against title rivals Liverpool in the final game of the season on 26 May 1989, with a last-minute goal by Michael Thomas giving Arsenal the 2–0 win they needed to secure the title.

Cast
 Colin Firth as Paul Ashworth
 Ruth Gemmell as Sarah Hughes
 Mark Strong as Steve
 Neil Pearson as Mr. Ashworth
 Lorraine Ashbourne as Mrs. Ashworth
 Holly Aird as Jo
 Stephen Rea as Ray
 Emily Conway as Sasha 
 Richard Claxton as Robert Parker
Annette Ekblom as Robert's Mother
 Andy Raines as Football Referee
 Mike Ingham as Radio Announcer
 Ken Stott as Ted, the Headmaster

Production
The film also stars Neil Pearson as Paul's father and Mark Strong as Steve, Paul's best friend. Nick Hornby has a cameo as a beaten opposition manager in a school football match. Parts of the film were shot on location in the surroundings of Arsenal Stadium in Highbury; as the terracing at Highbury had since been replaced, the scenes of fans on the terraces were instead filmed at Fulham's Craven Cottage stadium.

Remake
In 2005, the film was remade in an American version also entitled Fever Pitch starring Jimmy Fallon and Drew Barrymore, with the 2004 World Series Boston Red Sox replacing Arsenal.  To avoid confusion, this 2005 remake is known as The Perfect Catch in the UK.

References

External links
 
 

1997 films
1997 romantic comedy films
Arsenal F.C. mass media
British romantic comedy films
Film4 Productions films
British association football films
Films about educators
Films about fandom
Films set in London
Films set in 1988
Films set in 1989
Films based on works by Nick Hornby
Films with screenplays by Nick Hornby
Films à clef
Films based on autobiographies
1990s English-language films
1990s British films